Como Aproveitar o Fim do Mundo (English: How to Enjoy the End of the World) is a Brazilian comedy television series created by Fernanda Young and Alexandre Machado. It was produced and aired by Globo from November 1 to December 20, 2012, consisting of eight episodes.

In 2013, the series was released on DVD in a unique edition, in film format, originally imagined by director José Alvarenga Jr.

In 2016, an American remake of the series, titled No Tomorrow was developed by Corinne Brinkerhoff, and aired on The CW.

Como Aproveitar o Fim do Mundo was nominated for an International Emmy in 2013.

Plot
A woman sets off on a journey to enjoy her life at the most, believing the apocalypse will occur on December 21, 2012, while trying to explain it to her skeptic colleague.

Cast and characters

Main
 Alinne Moraes as Kátia Dornellas
 Danton Mello as Ernani da Silva
 Nelson Freitas as Ramon (Raposo)

Recurring
 Alberto Brigadeiro
 Ângela Rabelo as Elza
 Alejandro Claveaux as Leandro
 Carlos Capeletti
 Carolina Taulois as Carla
 Eduardo Mancini as Bêbado
 Fernando Dias
 Jorge Cerruti
 José Araújo
 Keli Freitas as Regina
 Luiz Serra as Seu Osmar
 Maria Eduarda as Silvia
 Martha Nowill as Letícia
 Regina Sampaio as Esther de Azevedo
 Rodrigo Rangel

Episodes

References

External links
 
 

2010s Brazilian television series
2012 Brazilian television series debuts
2012 Brazilian television series endings
Apocalyptic television series
Brazilian comedy television series
Rede Globo original programming